Front d'action politique (FRAP) was a municipal political party in Montreal, formed as a federation of workers' and citizens' committees in 1969.  

In 1970, the "October Crisis of 1970" occurred. At this time, FRAP's civil liberties were suspended, as Prime Minister Pierre Trudeau suspected FRAP to be associated with the criminal actions of the FLQ (Front de Liberation du Quebec). 

FRAP was concluded in 1971. 

The most well known member of FRAP was Jack Layton, former leader of the Official Opposition and the New Democratic Party.

References 

1969 establishments in Quebec
1971 disestablishments in Quebec
McGill University
Municipal political parties in Montreal
Organizations based in Montreal
Political parties disestablished in 1971
Political parties established in 1969
Defunct political parties in Canada